Louise Lovely (born Nellie Louise Carbasse; 28 February 1895 – 18 March 1980) was an Australian film actress of Swiss-Italian descent. She is credited by film historians for being the first Australian actress to have a successful career in Hollywood, signing a contract with Universal Pictures in the United States in 1914. Lovely appeared in 50 American films and ten Australian films before retiring from acting in 1925.

Early life
Louise Lovely was born Nellie Louise Carbasse in Paddington, Sydney to an Italian musician and composer father, Ferruccio Carlo Alberti, and a Swiss mother, Elise Louise Jeanne de Grüningen Lehmann, who had come to Australia in 1891, in the company of Sarah Bernhardt, and had decided to remain in Sydney once Bernhardt had left Australia.

Louise Lovely made her professional debut at age nine as Eva in a stage production of the classic Uncle Tom's Cabin, using the name Louise Carbasse.

Career

Early work
Lovely was acting with George Marlow's theatre company in Western Australia when she received a telegram from Gaston Mervale to appear in a series of movies for Australian Life Biograph Company.

Hollywood films
In 1914, Lovely moved to the United States with her husband, hoping to replicate her Australian success, settling in Los Angeles, California. In California, Lovely caught the attention of Universal Studios head Carl Laemmle who both gave her a contract with his studio and re-christened her Louise Lovely. She made her American debut alongside the legendary Lon Chaney in Father and the Boys in 1915, receiving strong reviews. She starred with Chaney again in several other films including her next release US film Stronger Than Death (1915) and The Gilded Spider and Tangled Hearts (both 1916).

Lovely became one of Universal's major early stars and a challenger to Mary Pickford's status as the golden girl of early silent cinema, but was dropped by the studio in 1918 following a contract dispute. Though she was subsequently picked up by 20th Century Fox, where she starred in a series of Westerns with William Farnum, her career never reached its earlier heights. Over a course of four years, she had appeared in fifty American films.

As a consequence of having her hair singed on an American movie set, she permanently changed her hair style from long flowing locks to a bob cut.

Return to Australia
In 1924, Lovely and her husband returned to Australia in pursuit of a new interest - film production. Lovely had maintained a long-time interest in the behind-the-scenes aspects of film, and had collaborated with Welch on a successful short documentary feature, A Day at the Studio, but her plans for her return to Australia were far more ambitious. Lovely and Welch undertook a nationwide talent search to encourage budding new movie actresses. Over 23,000 actors and actresses attended Lovely's auditions, which included demonstrations of movie equipment and acting technique, and which took place at prestigious locations such as Melbourne's Princess Theatre. Twenty were selected to appear in Lovely's next film venture Jewelled Nights (1925), which was written and directed by herself and her husband.

Based on the novel by Marie Bjelke Petersen, Jewelled Nights told the story of a young woman who escaped from an unhappy marriage, instead posing as a young man and finding refuge in a tough mining community, where she finds love with a fellow miner (played by Gordon Collingridge). Though it was an outstanding success, it did not recoup its high costs. The Australian film industry, once one of the most productive in the world, was about to fall into a slump that was to last for fifty years. Lovely was offered no more roles and could not afford any further independent productions, and thus, Jewelled Nights was her last film. Today, very little of the film survives other than outtakes and stills.

Prior to the production of Jewelled Nights, between 1921 and 1925, Lovely and Welch traveled throughout the United States and Australia, leading "A Day at the Studio", a traveling show in which audience members volunteered for on-stage "screen tests".

Personal life
Lovely married fellow actor Wilton Welch in February 1912, when she was sixteen years old, and relocated to the United States with him. Lovely testified at the Royal Commission on the Moving Picture Industry in Australia, suggesting a number of measures that might stimulate the struggling local film industry. Soon afterwards, she made a return to the stage. It was at around this time that Lovely's marriage to Wilton Welch disintegrated; Welch was homosexual, and from their return to Australia in 1924 they no longer lived together. Lovely and Welch were divorced in November 1928.

She married Melbourne theatre manager Andrew Bertie Cowen, known as "Bert Cowan", at the Melbourne Registry Office on Monday, 26 November 1928; the same day as her divorce was granted in Sydney. Her marriage to Cowan lasted for the rest of her life. Cowan had a background of drama, revue and pantomime before becoming involved with the picture theatre business. He was in turn manager of Hoyts' Regent, Plaza and Lyceum theatres in Melbourne before in 1934 taking on the Metro Theatre in Collins Street for MGM.

The couple moved to Hobart, Tasmania in 1946, where Cowan became the manager of the Prince of Wales Theatre. Lovely managed the theatre's sweet shop, where she worked until her death in 1980.

Filmography

Notes

References

Sources

External links

 
 Louise Lovely at the Women Film Pioneers Project
 
 Louise Lovely at the National Film and Sound Archive
 Louise Lovely, Significant Women Project (Tasmanian Government)
 

1895 births
1980 deaths
20th-century Australian actresses
Australian expatriate actresses in the United States
Australian film actresses
Australian people of Italian descent
Australian people of Swiss descent
Australian silent film actresses
Actresses from Hobart
Actresses from Sydney
Women film pioneers
19th-century Australian women